A Geode is a geological rock formation.

Geode may also refer to:

 Geode (processor), a microprocessor series
 Geode (trade association), a European gas and electricity distributors
 La Géode, an IMAX theater in the Cité des Sciences et de l'Industrie, Paris, France
 Bone cyst, also called a geode

See also
Geode State Park